Amorphoscelis papua is a species of praying mantis found in New Guinea.

References

Amorphoscelis
Arthropods of New Guinea
Insects described in 1914